Angel Fire is a village in Colfax County, New Mexico, United States. The population was 1,216 at the 2010 census. Angel Fire and nearby communities experience cold winter temperatures and mild temperatures in the summer.

To the north, off U.S. Route 64, is Vietnam Veterans Memorial State Park. Angel Fire is on the Enchanted Circle Scenic Byway.

Geography 

Angel Fire is located in southwestern Colfax County at  (36.378808, -105.285658). The village center is in the valley of Cieneguilla Creek, with housing developments climbing mountain slopes to the east and west.

To the west, US 64 climbs over Palo Flechado Pass in the Sangre de Cristo Mountains and leads  to Taos. New Mexico State Road 434 connects the center of Angel Fire with US 64 to the north and leads south  from the village center to Mora.

Demographics 

As of the census of 2000, there were 1,048 people, 462 households, and 340 families residing in the village. The population density was 36.3 people per square mile (14.0/km2). There were 1,791 housing units at an average density of 61.9 per square mile (23.9/km2). The racial makeup of the village was 90.46% White, 0.19% African American, 1.05% Native American, 0.95% Asian, 4.48% from other races, and 2.86% from two or more races. Hispanic or Latino of any race were 12.12% of the population.

There were 462 households, out of which 24.2% had children under the age of 18 living with them, 64.9% were married couples living together, 5.6% had a female householder with no husband present, and 26.2% were non-families. 20.6% of all households were made up of individuals, and 5.2% had someone living alone who was 65 years of age or older. The average household size was 2.27 and the average family size was 2.56.

In the village, the population was spread out, with 19.9% under the age of 18, 3.3% from 18 to 24, 22.7% from 25 to 44, 38.1% from 45 to 64, and 15.9% who were 65 years of age or older. The median age was 47 years. For every 100 females, there were 104.7 males. For every 100 females age 18 and over, there were 101.2 males.

The median income for a household in the village was $48,250, and the median income for a family was $56,125. Males had a median income of $35,417 versus $26,429 for females. The per capita income for the village was $29,614. About 6.7% of families and 11.7% of the population were below the poverty line, including 11.5% of those under age 18 and 2.3% of those age 65 or over.

Climate

Education 
The school district is Cimarron Municipal Schools.

Safety

The Angel Fire Fire Department is staffed daily from 7:30AM to 6:00PM, though those who are on staff are on call 24/7. There are three stations, Station One on North Angel Fire Road and Highway 434, Station Two on Highway 434 and El Vado Way, and Station Three on Highway 434 and Flamingo Road. Station One is manned with an engine, ambulance, and type six rescue truck. Station Two has a ladder truck (quint), a type three wild land truck, and an ambulance. Station Three has an ambulance, water tender, and two type six wild land trucks. All three ambulances are ALS capable and transport ready.

Transportation
Angel Fire is served by the Angel Fire Airport (AXX). The airport is managed and maintained by Ross Aviation/Pearce Enterprises and can accommodate corporate and private aircraft. UNICOM is 122.8. By elevation, Angel Fire Airport is the fifth highest in the United States. The airport briefly saw scheduled airline service during the winter of 1986/1987 by Mesa Airlines with a single flight to Albuquerque using a 19-seat Beechcraft 1900 aircraft.

Events 
 
Every summer, the Village of Angel Fire hosts Music from Angel Fire, which has been presenting chamber music concerts to local communities since 1984. Angel Fire venues include the United Church of Angel Fire, Angel Fire Baptist Church and Angel Fire Community Center.

Every summer, the Village of Angel Fire hosts Angel Fire Fest, which has been presenting chamber music concerts to local communities since 2021. It has a vibe described as "chill" and a fun atmosphere.

See also 
 Angel Fire Resort

References

External links

 Village of Angel Fire official website
 Angel Fire Convention & Visitors Bureau
 Enchanted Circle Scenic Byway
 Angel Fire Chamber of Commerce

Villages in Colfax County, New Mexico
Villages in New Mexico
Populated places established in 1986